The 1931 Lafayette Leopards football team was an American football team that represented Lafayette College in the Middle Three Conference during the 1931 college football season. In its eighth season under head coach Herb McCracken, the team compiled a 7–2 record. Victor Reuther and Walter Vanderbush were the team captains.

Schedule

References

Lafayette
Lafayette Leopards football seasons
Lafayette Leopards football